Arthotheliopsis serusiauxii is a species of leaf-dwelling lichen in the family Gomphillaceae. It was first formally described as a new species in 1997 by Robert Lücking, as a member of genus Echinoplaca. The type specimen was collected in Costa Rica, growing on the leaves of a dicotyledon. The specific epithet honours Belgian lichenologist Emmanuël Sérusiaux. In 2005, Lücking, Sérusiaux, and Antonín Vězda transferred it to genus Arthotheliopsis after a molecular analysis of the Gomphillaceae helped to clarify the phylogenetic relationships in the family.

References

Ostropales
Lichen species
Lichens described in 1997
Lichens of Central America
Taxa named by Robert Lücking